The wild goat (Capra aegagrus) is a wild goat species, inhabiting forests, shrublands and rocky areas ranging from Turkey and the Caucasus in the west to Turkmenistan, Afghanistan and Pakistan in the east. It has been listed as near threatened on the IUCN Red List and is threatened by destruction and degradation of habitat.

It is one of the ancestors of the domestic goat (C. hircus).

Taxonomy
Capra aegagrus was the scientific name proposed by Johann Christian Polycarp Erxleben in 1777 for the wild goat populations of the Caucasus and Taurus Mountains.
Capra blythi proposed by Allan Octavian Hume in 1874 were wild goat horns from Sindh.

The following wild goat subspecies are considered valid taxa:
Bezoar ibex C. a. aegagrus
Sindh ibex C. a. blythi
Chiltan ibex C. a. chialtanensis
Turkmen wild goat C. a. turcmenica
Capra aegagrus pictus

The kri-kri was once thought to be a subspecies of the wild goat, but is now considered to be a feral descendant of the domestic goat (Capra hircus), as Capra hircus cretica.

Distribution and habitat

In Armenia, wild goats were recorded in the Zangezur Mountains, in Khosrov State Reserve, and in highlands of the Syunik Province during field surveys from 2006 to 2007.
In Azerbaijan, wild goats occur in Ordubad National Park, Daralayaz and Murovdag mountain areas in Nakhchivan Autonomous Republic.
In Iran's Haftad Gholleh Protected Area, wild goat herds live foremost in west-facing areas with rocky substrates, water sources and steep slopes that are far from roads.
In Turkmenistan, wild goat populations inhabit the mountain ranges of Uly Balkan and Kopet Dag.
In Pakistan, wild goat herds occur in Kirthar National Park.

Behaviour and ecology
In Kirthar National Park, 283 wild goat groups were observed for 10 months in 1986. The group sizes ranged from two to 131 individuals but varied seasonally, with a mean ratio of two females per male.

In Dagestan, male wild goats start courting females in mid December. The rutting season lasts until the third week of January. Females give birth to between one and three kids in late June to mid July.

Older males drive younger males from the maternal herds. The gestation period averages 170 days. Kids are mobile almost immediately after birth. Kids are weaned after 6 months. Female goats reach sexual maturity at 1½–2½ years, males at 3½–4 years. The lifespan of a goat can be from 12 to 22 years.

Threats 
Wild goat populations are threatened foremost by poaching, habitat loss due to logging, and competition with domestic livestock for food resources.

See also
Feral goat
Mountain goat

References

External links 

Mammals described in 1777
Taxa named by Johann Christian Polycarp Erxleben
Capra (genus)
Goats
Fauna of Iran
Fauna of Jammu and Kashmir
Mammals of Central Asia
Mammals of Azerbaijan
Mammals of Europe
Mammals of Pakistan
Extant Pleistocene first appearances